The first inauguration of Ronald Reagan as the 40th president of the United States was held on Tuesday, January 20, 1981, at the West Front of the United States Capitol in Washington, D.C. This was the first inauguration to be held on the building's west side. This was the 49th inauguration and marked the commencement of Ronald Reagan's and George H. W. Bush's first term as president and vice president. Associate Justice Potter Stewart administered the vice presidential oath to Bush.

At  of age on Inauguration Day, Reagan was the oldest person to assume the presidency until Donald Trump in 2017. While the inauguration was taking place, the 52 Americans being held hostage in Iran were released.

Inaugural committee
The 1981 Joint Congressional Committee on Inaugural Ceremonies, the group responsible for the planning and execution of the inauguration, was composed of:
Senator Mark Hatfield (R-OR), Chairman
Senator Howard H. Baker Jr. (R-TN)
Senator Robert C. Byrd (D-WV)
Senator Claiborne Pell (D-RI)
Representative John J. Rhodes (R-AZ)
Representative Robert H. Michel (R-IL)
Representative Thomas P. O’Neill Jr. (D-MA)
Representative Jim Wright (D-TX)

It was this committee that made the decision to move the inauguration to the West Front of the Capitol from the East Portico, where it had been held, with few exceptions, since 1837. Decided upon in June 1980, the move was made in part to save money, since the West Front terraces could be used as an inaugural platform, eliminating the need to build one from scratch. Additionally, using the side of the building facing the National Mall would provide more space for spectators.

Ronald Reagan wore a stroller for daytime, and white tie for the inaugural ball.

Inaugural address and release of hostages

Reagan's inaugural address was 2,452 words long. It utilized the vista offered by the West Front, invoking the symbolism of the presidential memorials and Arlington National Cemetery in the distance. As Reagan was giving his address, the 52 Americans held hostage in Iran for 444 days were released.

The Reverend Donn Moomaw, pastor of the Bel Air Presbyterian Church in Los Angeles, where Reagan and his wife, Nancy, worshipped, gave the invocation and benediction at the ceremony, and said: "We thank you, O God, for the release of our hostages." However, his prayer came before the hostages left Tehran.

President Reagan was about to have lunch with congressional leaders in Statuary Hall in the Capitol after the inauguration ceremony when he was informed that the plane carrying the hostages had left Iranian airspace. During the luncheon, he broke the news saying: "With thanks to Almighty God, I have been given a tag line, the get-off line, that everyone wants for the end of a toast or a speech, or anything else. Some 30 minutes ago, the planes bearing our prisoners left Iranian air space, and they're now free of Iran." It is quite possible that the hostages left Tehran right before the ceremony started.  The press held off on the announcement because it was next to impossible to discuss this development and the unfolding ceremony at the same time.

Throughout Washington and throughout the country, there were celebrations to mark the inauguration and the release of the hostages. For the only time, the National Christmas tree on the ellipse near the White House was lighted on an Inauguration Day, and it was done to mark the release of the hostages. There were signs saying "444 DAYS!" as part of the celebrations. People wrapped the country in yellow ribbons, plastered freedom messages on billboards, and started preparations for welcoming the freed hostages home. The yellow-ribbon became a symbol of the solidarity of Americans with the hostages. The Statue of Liberty in New York Harbor was bathed in light, the Empire State Building lit in red, white, and blue, and the Boston Fire Department sounded gongs to hail deliverance of the hostages.

Weather

See also
Presidential transition of Ronald Reagan
Second inauguration of Ronald Reagan
Timeline of the Ronald Reagan presidency (1981)
1980 United States presidential election
Ronald Reagan 1980 presidential campaign
Iran hostage crisis

References

External links

 Full text of the speech
 Full text, video, and audio of the speech

1981 speeches
1981 in American politics
1981 in Washington, D.C.
Inaug 1
United States presidential inaugurations
Inauguration 1981
Iran hostage crisis
January 1981 events in the United States